"Keep It Dark" is a song by British band Genesis, released on 23 October 1981 in the UK as the second single from Abacab.  It reached number 33 in the UK Singles Chart.

Song information
A light rock song, it describes a man who has been to the future and has seen a bright, happy world where everyone is filled with joy, cities are filled with light, with no fear of war, and all exploitation has ceased as all creatures have happier lives.  Once he returns, however, he is pressured to lie about the incident (i.e., to "keep it dark"). Instead he claims that he was kidnapped by thieves who wanted to take his money. . The cover depicts the three wise monkeys.

In the DVD interview accompanying the 2007 re-release of Abacab, the album from which the song comes, composer Tony Banks said that "the idea was that this character had to pretend that he'd just been robbed by people and that's why he'd disappeared for a few weeks, and in fact what had happened [was] he'd been to the future and gone to this fantastic world where everything was wonderful and beautiful and everything... but he couldn't tell anybody that, because no one would believe him and the powers that be kept him silent."

The song's structure is unusual: the rhythm is in a 6/4 time signature, with a distinctly syncopated rhythm guitar part. Lead singer Phil Collins sings in falsetto for certain lines of the song. The pace overall, particularly the drums, is similar to the album's title track.

Music video
A music video supported the single release of the song, featuring Collins, Tony Banks, and Rutherford in two different settings. In the first and second verses and the fade out, the band walks along bleak city streets (in Amsterdam) wearing trenchcoats and fedoras. When the chorus comes in, it shifts to the band wearing all-white suits and sunglasses, and walking through a field, with the sun shining. In both settings, Banks mimes with a mini Casio keyboard and Rutherford with the neck from a guitar, while Collins keeps the beat of the song with drumsticks, mostly hitting air, or the walls of the Amsterdam houses.

Credits 
 Tony Banks – keyboards
 Phil Collins – drums, percussion, vocals 
 Mike Rutherford – electric guitar, bass pedals

Other versions
Prog rock band World Trade recorded a cover version for the Genesis tribute album Supper's Ready in 1996.
In 2007, Phil Collins' son, Simon Collins, recorded his own version of the song with Dave Kerzner, Kelly Nordstrom and Andre Fedorow, as a tribute to Genesis on their 40th anniversary.

References

1981 singles
Genesis (band) songs
Songs written by Tony Banks (musician)
Songs written by Phil Collins
Songs written by Mike Rutherford
1981 songs
Charisma Records singles